George Hamilton Pettit (10 August 1872 – 5 June 1953) was a Canadian politician and barrister. Pettit served as a Conservative member of the House of Commons of Canada. He was born in Richmond, Ontario.

Pettit attended public and secondary schools at Cornwall, Ontario. He then studied at Osgoode Hall Law School where he graduated in 1894. He became president of the Welland County Telephone Company. From May to October 1913, he was a deputy and acting court judge at Welland County.

He was first elected to Parliament at the Welland riding in the 1925 general election then re-elected in 1926 and 1930. After completing his third term in office, Pettit left federal politics and did not seek another term in the 1935 federal election.

References

External links
 

1872 births
1953 deaths
Canadian chief executives
Judges in Ontario
Conservative Party of Canada (1867–1942) MPs
Members of the House of Commons of Canada from Ontario
Lawyers in Ontario
Osgoode Hall Law School alumni